Greatest Hits is the first compilation album by American country music singer Clay Walker. It was released in 1998. Two previously unreleased tracks ("Ordinary People" and "You're Beginning to Get to Me") are included on this album; both were issued as singles in 1998. The former peaked at #35 on the Billboard country charts, while the latter was a #2 hit for Walker.

Background
In an interview with Tulsa World, Walker stated about the album, "I'm just kind of funny about the word "great' being used with my name, putting "great' with something I do ... I don't know. I'm really not that kind of guy"

Track listing

Personnel

 Eddie Bayers – drums
 Bruce Bouton – steel guitar
 Mike Brignardello – bass guitar
 Larry Byrom – acoustic guitar, electric guitar
 Jimmy Carter – bass guitar
 Steve Dorff – conductor, string arrangements
 Dan Dugmore – steel guitar
 Glen Duncan – fiddle
 Stuart Duncan – fiddle, mandolin
 Paul Franklin – dobro, steel guitar
 Kyle Frederick – acoustic guitar
 Sonny Garrish – steel guitar
 Johnny Gimble – fiddle
 Aubrey Haynie – fiddle
 John Hobbs – piano
 Jim Horn – saxophone
 Byron House – bass guitar
 Dann Huff – electric guitar
 Jana King – background vocals
 Terry McMillan – harmonica
 Brent Mason – electric guitar
 Tim Mensy – acoustic guitar
 The Nashville String Machine – strings
 Steve Nathan – keyboards, piano
 Bobby Ogdin – piano
 Larry Paxton – bass guitar
 Van Rentz – piano
 Tom Roady – percussion
 Jason Roberts – fiddle
 Matt Rollings – piano
 Brent Rowan – acoustic guitar, electric guitar
 John Wesley Ryles – background vocals
 Tim Sargeant – steel guitar
 Maxwell Schauf – drums
 Leland Sklar – bass guitar
 Joe Spivey – fiddle
 Landon Taylor – electric guitar
 Wayne Toups – accordion
 Clay Walker – lead vocals
 Billy Joe Walker Jr. – acoustic guitar
 Lonnie Wilson – drums
 Glenn Worf – bass guitar
 Curtis Wright – background vocals
 Curtis Young – background vocals

Critical reception

Kris Teo of Sunday Mail wrote "The material will never be confused with thinking man's country since it punches all the predictable thematic buttons. On this solid 14-track smoking-gun compilation, he celebrates the trials and tribulations of the common man." Jason Birchmeier of AllMusic gave the album four and a half stars and wrote, "you won't find a better one-disc summary of his prime." Walter Allread of Country Standard Time gave the album a favorable review.

Chart performance
During the week of  June 27, 1998, the album sold over 35,000 units.

Weekly charts

Year-end charts

Certifications

References

1998 greatest hits albums
Albums produced by James Stroud
Clay Walker albums
Giant Records (Warner) compilation albums